The Manpower Directorate was a division of the Government of Australia established in January, 1942 to be responsible for active service and support industry recruitment during World War II to combat labor shortages in strategic areas. The agency had extensive power and reach in furtherance of this effort:

References

Defunct Commonwealth Government agencies of Australia
Employment in Australia